Insam-ju, also called ginseng liquor or ginseng wine, is an alcoholic beverage made of ginseng. As ginseng itself, the liquor is one of the specialities of both North and South Korea.

The liquor can be served either cold or hot.

References 

Korean alcoholic drinks